The 2008 North Carolina lieutenant gubernatorial election was held on November 4, 2008, as part of the elections to the Council of State.  North Carolina also held a gubernatorial election on the same day, but the offices of governor and lieutenant governor are elected independently.

Democrat Walter H. Dalton was elected lieutenant governor, succeeding term-limited Beverly Perdue, who was elected governor the same day. Dalton won a slightly larger percentage of the vote than did Perdue in her gubernatorial race, while Republican Robert Pittenger won a slightly smaller percentage than GOP gubernatorial nominee Pat McCrory and Libertarian Phillip Rhodes won a slightly larger percentage than his party's nominee for governor, Michael Munger.

, this was the last time a Democrat was elected Lieutenant Governor of North Carolina.

Primary elections

Democratic Party
Walter H. Dalton, North Carolina State Senator
Hampton Dellinger, former Deputy Attorney General of North Carolina and former legal counsel to Governor Mike Easley
Patrick Smathers, Mayor of Canton
Dan Besse, Winston-Salem City Councilman

Republican Party
Robert Pittenger, North Carolina State Senator
Jim Snyder, former state representative and nominee for lieutenant governor in 2004
Timothy Cook, alternative fuel chemist and candidate for lieutenant governor in 2004
Greg Dority, security consultant

General election

Candidates
Walter H. Dalton (Democratic)
Robert Pittenger (Republican)
Phillip Rhodes (Libertarian)

Result

Footnotes

External links
OurCampaigns.com - Democratic primary for Lt. Governor
OurCampaigns.com - Republican primary for Lt. Governor

2008 North Carolina elections
2008 United States lieutenant gubernatorial elections
2008